Johnny Mitchell is a former American football player.

Johnny Mitchell may also refer to:

Johnny Mitchell (baseball)
Johnny Mitchell (ice hockey)
Jonny Mitchell, reality TV participant

See also
John Mitchell (disambiguation)
Jon Mitchell (disambiguation)
Jonathan Mitchell (disambiguation)
Joni Mitchell